Helen FitzGerald (born 1966 in Shepparton, Australia) is a bestselling novelist and screenwriter. Her debut novel, Dead Lovely, was published by Allen & Unwin in 2007, and The Exit in 2015 by Faber & Faber. Viral was released in 2016.

Background
She was raised in the country town of Kilmore, Victoria; the twelfth in a family of thirteen children. She studied English and History at the University of Melbourne, before later attending Glasgow University where she completed a Diploma and Masters in Social Work. She began writing while working as a criminal justice social worker, where for a period she worked with serious sex offenders in Glasgow's Barlinnie Prison. She quit this job for a time to focus solely on her writing career, before returning to the field part-time. She cites her experience as a social worker an inspiration in the subject matter of her writing.

Writing
FitzGerald began as a screenwriter, writing scripts for a series of educational children's dramas for BBC Scotland. However, she became frustrated with the industry when none of her subsequent screenplays were produced, and she turned to novel-writing. She states that the rules of screenwriting are very stringent, but that in having learned them she has improved as a writer.

Her books are mostly thrillers, though she herself has described her genre as "Domestic Noir", a term coined by her fellow author Julia Crouch.

Works 
FitzGerald has written fifteen novels to date:
 Dead Lovely, published 2007
 The Devil's Staircase, published 2009
 My Last Confession, published 2009
 Bloody Women, published 2009
 Amelia O'Donohue is SO not a Virgin, published 2010
 The Donor, published 2011
 Hot Flush, published 2011
 The Duplicate, published 2012
 Deviant, published 2013
 The Cry, published 2013, The Cry was adapted as a BBC serial (2018) starring Jenna Colman and Ewen Leslie. 
 The Exit, published 2015
 Viral, published 2016
Worst Case Scenario, 2019 
Ash Mountain, 2021
Keep Her Sweet, 2022

Critical reaction
A few critics noted that FitzGerald's first book, while generally described as a crime novel, did not follow the traditional rules of the genre. They argued that it belonged to a different, more psychologically complex tradition, characterised by the dark humour and flawed anti-heroines of writers such as Tama Janowitz and Fay Weldon. Novelist Mark Abernethy wrote of FitzGerald: "She has managed to do what Fay Weldon did in The Life and Loves of a She-Devil, which is to find the joke in what appalls us." Australian critic Sally Murphy described the novel as compelling but hard to classify, with "elements of chick-lit mixed with ghastly scenes of murder and retribution", while Adelaide writer Cath Kenneally highlighted FitzGerald's technique of underpinning audacious and potentially shocking material – "working blue" – with "sociological acumen".

The Cry has received the widest critical acclaim of any of FitzGerald's novels to date, with Fitzgerald's friend Doug Johnstone from The Independent on Sunday stating: "Astonishingly good. It is utterly harrowing, completely plausible, constantly nerve-shredding ... It plays on the deepest, darkest fears of all parents about their children, and embeds that everyday terror in a plot so up-to-the-minute that you'll swear it's been lifted from the pages of a newspaper ... The Cry is a remarkable novel – its devastating power all the stronger for its realistic rendering. Brilliant stuff."

Nominations
FitzGerald has been nominated for several awards, including:
 2010 Davitt Award for The Devil's Staircase
 2010 Spinetingler Award for The Devil's Staircase
 2012 Davitt Award for The Donor
 2014 Theakstons Old Peculier Crime Novel of the Year Award for The Cry
 2014 Davitt Award for The Cry
 2020 Theakstons Old Peculier Crime Novel of the Year Award, shortlisted for Worst Case Scenario

References

External links
Website
http://orendabooks.co.uk/helen-fitzgerald/
https://www.bbc.co.uk/programmes/p06nkddf

1966 births
Living people
21st-century Australian novelists
Australian women screenwriters
Australian women novelists
People from Shepparton
21st-century Australian women writers
Writers from Victoria (Australia)
21st-century Australian screenwriters